A Request for Quote (RfQ) is a financial term for certain way to ask a bank for an offer of a given financial instrument from a bank, made available by so-called Approved Publication Arrangement (APA) by the stock markets itself or by Financial data vendors as required in Europe by MiFID II and in effect since January 2018. A RFQ contains at least the ISIN to uniquely identify the financial product, the type (buy/ sell), the amount, a currency, and the volume ( in given currency).

Background 
In the wake of the 2007-09 financial crisis there was an initiative to create more pre-trade transparency, for which it is essential to know who is requesting which financial product.

Article 1(2) of the Commission Delegated Regulation (EU) 2017/583 of 14 July 2016 (which supplements Regulation (EU) No 600/2014 of the European Parliament and of the Council on markets in financial instruments) defines:

This essentially means, that everybody buying or selling stocks, bonds, foreign exchange, commodities or exchange-traded funds (ETFs) will (automatically) generate an RfQ before the trade is settled.

References

External links 
The MiFID II and APA data is distributed e.g. by
 https://www.bloomberg.com/professional/product/apa/
 https://www.mds.deutsche-boerse.com/mds-de/data-services/marktdaten-in-echtzeit/deutsche-boerse-mifid-ii-apa-service
 https://www.refinitiv.com/en/mifid/solutions-and-services/apa-and-publication-services

Further reading:
 https://www.cnbc.com/2017/12/15/mifid-2-all-you-need-to-know.html ― a concise summary on the topic, understandable for laymen.

Finance